Statue of Jorge Matute Remus may refer to:

 Statue of Jorge Matute Remus (Centro, Guadalajara), Jalisco, Mexico
 Statue of Jorge Matute Remus (Rotonda de los Jaliscienses Ilustres), Centro, Guadalajara, Jalisco, Mexico